Blum Independent School District is a public school district based in Blum, Texas, United States.  The district operates one high school, Blum High School.

Finances
As of the 2010–2011 school year, the appraised valuation of property in the district was $136,883,000. The maintenance tax rate was $0.117 and the bond tax rate was $0.021 per $100 of appraised valuation.

Academic achievement
In 2011, the school district was rated "recognized" by the Texas Education Agency.  Thirty-five percent of districts in Texas in 2011 received the same rating. No state accountability ratings will be given to districts in 2012. A school district in Texas can receive one of four possible rankings from the Texas Education Agency: Exemplary (the highest possible ranking), Recognized, Academically Acceptable, and Academically Unacceptable (the lowest possible ranking).

Historical district TEA accountability ratings
2011: Recognized
2010: Exemplary
2009: Academically Acceptable
2008: Academically Acceptable
2007: Academically Acceptable
2006: Academically Acceptable
2005: Academically Acceptable
2004: Academically Acceptable

Schools
In the 2011–2012 school year, the district had students in three schools.
Regular instructional
Blum High School (Grades 6-12)
Blum Elementary School (Grades PK-5).
JJAEP instructional
Hill County JJAEP

Athletics
Boys
Baseball
Basketball
Football
Wrestling.
Girls
Basketball
Volleyball

For the 2012 through 2014 school years, Blum played six-man football in UIL Class 1A 6-man Football Division I.

State titles
Football
2019(1A/D1) Six Man
Volleyball
2022(1A)

State Finalists
Volleyball
2021(1A)

See also

List of school districts in Texas
List of high schools in Texas

References

External links
Blum ISD

School districts in Hill County, Texas